Awusone Yekeni (born 23 June 1983) is a Ghanaian amateur boxer best known for winning a bronze medal at the 2006 Commonwealth Games at the heavyweight 201 lbs limit.

Career
He upset favorite Emmanuel Izonritei in his first bout and beat Scot Steven Simmons before losing the semifinal to local favorite and eventual winner Bradley Michael Pitt in 13:25.

At the Olympic qualifiers he lost to Mohamed Arjaoui and Durodola Olanrewaju and failed in his bid.

External links
Bio

1983 births
Living people
Heavyweight boxers
Boxers at the 2006 Commonwealth Games
Boxers at the 2010 Commonwealth Games
Commonwealth Games bronze medallists for Ghana
Ghanaian male boxers
Commonwealth Games medallists in boxing
Medallists at the 2006 Commonwealth Games
Medallists at the 2010 Commonwealth Games